Voice over Wireless LAN (VoWLAN), also Voice over WiFi (VoWiFi), is the use of a wireless broadband network according to the IEEE 802.11 standards for the purpose of vocal conversation. In essence, it is Voice over IP (VoIP) over a Wi-Fi network. In most cases, the Wi-Fi network and voice components supporting the voice system are privately owned.

VoWLAN can be conducted over any Internet accessible device, including a laptop, PDA or VoWLAN units which look and function like DECT and cellphones. Just like for IP-DECT, the VoWLAN's main advantages to consumers are cheaper local and international calls, free calls to other VoWLAN units and a simplified integrated billing of both phone and Internet service providers.

Although VoWLAN and 3G have certain feature similarities, VoWLAN is different in the sense that it uses a wireless internet network (typically 802.11) rather than a cellular network. Both VoWLAN and 3G are used in different ways, although with a femtocell the two can deliver similar service to users and can be considered alternatives.

Applications
For a single location organisation it enables use of existing Wi-Fi network for low (or no) cost of use VoIP (hence VoWLAN) communication in a similar manner to land mobile radio system or walkie-talkie systems with push to talk and emergency broadcast channels. They are also used across multiple locations for mobile workers such as delivery drivers, these workers need to take advantage of 3G type services whereby a cellular company provide data access between the handheld device and the companies back-end network.

Benefits
A voice over WLAN system offers several benefits to organizations, such as hospitals and warehouses. Such advantages include increased mobility and cost savings. For instance, nurses and doctors within a hospital can maintain voice communications at any time at less cost, compared to cellular service.

Types
as an extension to cellular network using Generic Access Network or Unlicensed Mobile Access (the equivalent but more commercial term).
as a local network independent of cellular company.

Design considerations
A Wi-Fi network that supports voice telephony must be carefully designed in a way that maximizes performance and is able to support the applicable call density. A voice network includes call gateways in addition to the Wi-Fi access points. The gateways provide call handling among wireless IP phones and connections to traditional telephone systems. The Wi-Fi network supporting voice applications must provide much stronger signal coverage than what's needed for most data-only applications. In addition, the Wi-Fi network must provide seamless roaming between access points.

Commercial service
One of the attractions of VoWLAN is that it uses widely available Wi-Fi and as such can be used without involving a service provider (e.g. running a Skype client on a laptop connected to the internet over Wi-Fi).   However, there are network operators who use this technology as part of their service offer, typically using Unlicensed Mobile Access to deliver voice service at home. Example's include T-Mobile @Home in USA, or Orange's UNIK service in France.

Alternatives
As noted above, in many contexts a femtocell, using cellular technology to connect to standard terminals, can be considered an alternative to VoWLAN.

See also

 Local area network
 Mobile VoIP
 Voice over LTE

References

Wireless networking
Voice over IP